Merab Mamardashvili (September 15, 1930 – November 25, 1990) was a Georgian philosopher.

Biography
He was born in Gori (Eastern Georgia). In 1955 he graduated from the Faculty of Philosophy of the Moscow State University. From 1968 to 1987 he was a deputy editor of the scientific journal "Voprosi Filosofii" ("Questions of Philosophy"). He became a professor of the Moscow State University and a senior research fellow of the Moscow Institute of Philosophy of the Russian Academy of Science. From 1987-1990 Mamardashvili was head of the Department of the Tsereteli Institute of Philosophy of the Georgian Academy of Sciences and Professor of the Tbilisi State University.

In his life only a few books were published, his lectures (for his style of lecturing he and others called them "dialogues" or "conversations" and he was called "Russian (or Georgian) Socrates") were taped and published after his death by his disciple Yuri Senokosov, co-founder with Elena Nemirovskaya of the former Moscow School of Political Studies . Lecturing abroad, Mamardashvili gave talks in Germany, France, and other countries. He died from a heart attack at Moscow Vnukovo airport on November 25, 1990 and was buried in Tbilisi in a family grave on the Saburtalo cemetery.

Influenced by René Descartes and classical German philosophy (especially Immanuel Kant), Mamardashvili contributed to rationalist theory of perception.
His main research fields were: general gnoseological notion of processes of analysis and synthesis, the methodology of science and of the historic-philosophical studies, the role of consciousness in social being, the relationship between consciousness and the aesthetics, the overall meta-theory of language and consciousness. He considered the consciousness the ultimate subject of philosophy. Some of the most famous phrases, coined by Mamardashvili are: "consciousness is paradoxicalness impossible to get used to", "consciousness is an experience of inexperiensible experiences", "phenomenology is the accompanying feature of all the philosophy", "loneliness is my profession" and so on.

In the preview to the edition of the major compilation of his works by St. Petersburg publishing house "Azbooka-classica" in 2002 he has been introduced "one of the most interesting contemporary philosophers, a man of impeccable style, magical fascination and rare kindness". It was also noted there, that all of his interests were concentrated around the human personality, its freedom and responsibility, on the role of philosophy in life and its place in the culture.

In May 2001 a monument to him was unveiled in Tbilisi.

Bibliography 
 The process of analysis and synthesis (1958)("Процессы анализа и синтеза") 
 Forms and Contents of Thinking (1968) (Формы и содержание мышления)
 Converted form [1970] ( "Форма превращенная" - article for the Encyclopedia of Philosophy)
 Symbol and Consciousness  (Символ и сознание), (1974), together with A. Piatigorsky (published 1982)
 The Problem of Objective Method in Psychology (1977)
  The Arrow of Cognition (1978) 
 Classic and Non-classic Ideals of Rationality (1984) (Классические и неклассические идеалы рациональности) 
 Phenomenology and its Role in Contemporary Philosophy (1988)
 How Do I Understand Philosophy? (1990) (Как я понимаю философию) 
 Kantian Themes (1990) ("Кантианские вариации", published 1991 in the philosophical almanac "Quintessence" p. 120-158)
 Conscious and the Philosophical Calling (1988)
 Cartesian Meditations[1986] (published 1993) (Картезианские размышления)
  Aesthetics of Thinking [1987](published 1993) ("Эстетика мышления")
 Psychological Topology of Path (Lectures on Proust)[1981] (published 1997) (Психологическая топология пути (Лекции о Прусте))

 Documentaries 
 Socrates in a duel (dir. Tamara Dularidze)
 Georgian Kant (dir. Olga Rolengoff)
 The way home (dir. Nikolai Drozdov)
 Time of Merab (dir. Olesya Fokina)
 Merab Mamardashvili (dir. Valery Balayan)

 See also 

 Evald Ilyenkov
 List of Georgians
 Philosophy in the Soviet Union

References

 External links 
 A 1989 Interview from The Civic Arts Review'' journal of Ohio Wesleyan University
 About the monument
 Merab Mamardashvili at the Gallery of ISFP
 Merab Mamardashvili’s Philosophy of Consciousness

1930 births
1990 deaths
20th-century Russian  philosophers
Exophonic writers
Philosophers from Georgia (country)
Moscow State University alumni
People from Gori, Georgia
Soviet philosophers
Academic staff of Tbilisi State University
Academic staff of High Courses for Scriptwriters and Film Directors